Bikini Paradise is a 1967 American comedy film directed by Gregg G. Tallas and starring Janette Scott, Kieron Moore and John Baer.

The film's sets were designed by the art director Eugène Lourié. Location shooting took place in the Canary Islands. It was also known as White Savage.

Plot
Shortly after World War II two naval officers are sent to find Harriet Pembroke a schoolteacher who fled from the Japanese forces. Eventually they discover her on a small Pacific island with an all-female population of which she has become the leader.

Cast
Janette Scott as Rachel
Kieron Moore as Lieut. Allison Fraser
John Baer as Lieut. Anthony Crane
Kay Walsh as Harriet Pembroke
Alexander Knox as Commissioner Lighton
Anna Brazzou as Maya
Sylvia Sorente as Daphne
Margaret Nolan as Margarita
 Robert Beatty as Commissioner 
Michele Mahaut as Lisa
Francine Welch as Charlotte
Pilar Clemens as Julia
Aida Power as Ingrid

References

Bibliography
 Jean-Louis Ginibre, John Lithgow & Barbara Cady. Ladies Or Gentlemen: A Pictorial History of Male Cross-dressing in the Movies. Filipacchi Publishing, 2005.

External links

Bikini Paradise at TCMDB

1967 films
Allied Artists films
American comedy films
1960s English-language films
Films shot in Spain
Films directed by Gregg G. Tallas
Films scored by Johnny Douglas
Films set in the Pacific Ocean
1967 comedy films
1960s American films